Jan Kreisinger (born 6 September 1984 in Žatec) is a Czech long-distance runner. At the 2012 Summer Olympics, he competed in the Men's marathon, finishing in 67th place.

References

1984 births
Living people
People from Žatec
Czech male long-distance runners
Czech male marathon runners
Olympic athletes of the Czech Republic
Athletes (track and field) at the 2012 Summer Olympics
Czech male cross country runners
Sportspeople from the Ústí nad Labem Region